Dame Laurentia McLachlan, OSB, née Margaret McLachlan, (11 January 1866 – 23 August 1953) was a Scottish Benedictine nun, Abbess of Stanbrook Abbey, and an authority on church music. She became posthumously known to a wide public when portrayed on the stage in a 1988 play, The Best of Friends.

Life and work
McLachlan was born in Coatbridge, Lanarkshire, Scotland, the youngest of seven children of Henry McLachlan, an accountant, and his wife, Mary née McAleese. In 1884 she joined the Benedictine abbey at Stanbrook Abbey. In 1931 she was elected Abbess of Stanbrook. Dame Laurentia, as she became known, served the wider Benedictine community as a member of the commission, set up that same year with the aim of modernising the various constitutions that governed the conditions of monastic life for women in England.

She was a pioneer in the restoration of the Gregorian chant in England and a leading authority on music and medieval manuscripts. In 1934 her work was recognised by Pope Pius XI who bestowed on her the Bene Merenti medal for her contribution to Church music.

Dame Laurentia died in 1953, at the Abbey, having spent seventy of her 87 years within the strictly enclosed monastery. She was one of five figures chosen to represent one thousand years of "the inspired Christian life" at Worcester Cathedral's "Window of the Millennium". A 1988 stage play by Hugh Whitemore, The Best of Friends (based on a book entitled: The Nun, the Infidel and the Superman by Dame Felicitas Corrigan), provides a window on the friendship of McLachlan with Sir Sydney Cockerell and Bernard Shaw through adaptations from their letters and writings. McLachlan was first played by Rosemary Harris;  in a 2006 revival at the Hampstead Theatre, Patricia Routledge played the part.

References

D. Felicitas Corrigan, The Nun, the Infidel & the Superman: The Remarkable Friendships of Dame Laurentia McLachlan with Sydney Cockerell, Bernard Shaw and others (John Murray, 1985)
The Benedictines of Stanbrook, In a Great Tradition: Tribute to Dame Laurentia McLachlan, Abbess of Stanbrook (John Murray, 1956)

1866 births
1953 deaths
Benedictine nuns
People from Coatbridge
Scottish Roman Catholic abbesses
Scottish music historians
Scottish antiquarians
20th-century British Roman Catholic nuns
19th-century British Roman Catholic nuns